Lee Sheng-feng (born 10 July 1953) is a Taiwanese politician.

Career
Lee was first elected to the Legislative Yuan in 1986, as a member of the Kuomintang. During his first year in office, he engaged in debate about the political status of Taiwan, and commented on the end of martial law, stating, "It has made the entire society more lively. The political atmosphere has changed so that there are no taboos. We can talk and think about anything." He was reelected to a second term in 1989. Lee contested the 1993 Taipei County magisterial election as a member of the New Party, and lost the office to You Ching. With the support of the New Party, Lee was co-nominated by the Kuomintang in the elections of 2004, but did not win a legislative seat. He was placed on the New Party list in 2008, but did not win election to the Legislative Yuan via proportional representation. 

Within the New Party, Lee has served as secretary-general, and as the national committee adviser.

References

1953 births
Living people
New Party (Taiwan) politicians
Kuomintang Members of the Legislative Yuan in Taiwan
Members of the 1st Legislative Yuan in Taiwan
Yunlin County Members of the Legislative Yuan
Tainan Members of the Legislative Yuan
Chiayi City Members of the Legislative Yuan
Chiayi County Members of the Legislative Yuan